Chilo ingulatellus is a moth in the family Crambidae. It was described by Wang and Sung in 1981. It is found in China (Beijing).

References

Chiloini
Moths described in 1981